Sierraville Dearwater Airport  is a county-owned public-use airport located one nautical mile (2 km) southeast of the central business district of Sierraville, in Sierra County, California, United States.

Facilities and aircraft 
Sierraville Dearwater Airport covers an area of 28 acres (11 ha) at an elevation of 4,984 feet (1,519 m) above mean sea level. It has one runway designated 3/21 with an asphalt surface measuring 3,260 by 50 feet (994 x 15 m). For the 12-month period ending May 31, 2010, the airport had 1,000 general aviation aircraft operations, an average of 83 per month.

References

External links 
 Aerial image as of September 1998 from USGS The National Map

Airports in California
Transportation in Sierra County, California
Buildings and structures in Sierra County, California